The Portland Garden Club is a historic building located in Portland, Oregon, United States. It was listed on the National Register of Historic Places in 2005.

See also
 National Register of Historic Places listings in Southwest Portland, Oregon

Notes

References

External links

1954 establishments in Oregon
Cultural infrastructure completed in 1954
Goose Hollow, Portland, Oregon
Modern Movement architecture in the United States
National Register of Historic Places in Portland, Oregon